Nebria piute is a species of brownish-black coloured ground beetle in the Nebriinae subfamily that is endemic to Utah, United States.

References

piute
Beetles described in 1972
Beetles of North America
Endemic fauna of Utah